Genesis Live: The Mama Tour is a concert film by the English progressive rock band Genesis, released for home video in October 1985 by Virgin Music Video. It contains highlights from the group's five concerts at the National Exhibition Centre in Birmingham in February 1984 at the end of their Mama Tour, supporting their 1983 album Genesis. It was directed by Jim Yukich.

Background
Two-thirds of the group's then current eponymous album appears on this video: the singles "Mama", "That's All", "Illegal Alien", "It's Gonna Get Better" (the B-side of "Mama"), and the two-piece suite "Home by the Sea/Second Home by the Sea".

Two singles from the previous album Abacab are also performed ("Keep It Dark" and the title track), and the set is rounded off with a medley of songs from their 1970s period, and the stage favourite "Turn It On Again". The latter song diverges into a medley of well-known songs by artists from bygone years, while the "In the Cage" suite includes extracts from "The Cinema Show", "...In That Quiet Earth", and the "Raven" section from "The Colony of Slippermen".

The tracks that were not included on the video that were performed at the shows were the show's opening track "Dodo/Lurker", the "Eleventh Earl of Mar/The Lamb Lies Down on Broadway/Firth of Fifth/The Musical Box" medley, "The Carpet Crawlers", "Follow You Follow Me" and "Los Endos".

The artwork incorporates aspects of the sleeves from the "Mama" single and the album Genesis, and also gives a nod to the light show for which the band was well known.

The Mama Tour was released on DVD, with 5.1 DTS and Dolby Digital sound, in November 2009 as part of the Genesis Movie Box 1981–2007 DVD set.

Track listing
 "Abacab"
 "That's All"
 "Mama"
 "Illegal Alien"
 "Home by the Sea"
 "Second Home by the Sea"
 "Keep It Dark"
 "It's Gonna Get Better"
 "In the Cage Medley" ("Cinema Show"/"...In That Quiet Earth")
 "Afterglow"
 "Drum Duet"
 "Turn It On Again Medley"

Personnel 
Phil Collins – drums, lead vocals
Tony Banks – keyboards, backing vocals
Mike Rutherford – guitar, bass, backing vocals
Daryl Stuermer – guitar, bass, backing vocals
Chester Thompson – drums

Certifications

Notes

Tony Banks has stated in interviews, he was not fond of his keyboards setup in between the drum sets on stage.  This tour was the only tour where his keyboards were set up like this.

References
http://www.genesis-music.com/news/news.php?uid=475

Genesis (band) video albums
1985 live albums
1985 video albums
Live video albums
1980s English-language films